Wade-Beckham House, also known as Beckham House, is a historic home located near Lancaster, Lancaster County, South Carolina. It was built ca 1832 and is a two-story frame residence, in a blend of Greek Revival and Neo-Classical styles. Originally one room deep, the structure was doubled in size in 1916. The original porch on the front remains basically intact. A one-story kitchen wing and porch on the rear of the structure were part of the 1916 addition.  Also on the property are a contributing small wooden store and a barn.

It was added to the National Register of Historic Places in 1988.

References

Houses on the National Register of Historic Places in South Carolina
Houses completed in 1845
Greek Revival houses in South Carolina
Neoclassical architecture in South Carolina
Houses in Lancaster County, South Carolina
National Register of Historic Places in Lancaster County, South Carolina